The Lost Son is a 1999 crime drama starring French actor Daniel Auteuil and set in London. It was directed by Chris Menges.

Plot
Xavier Lombard is a Parisian private detective based in London. His best friend is Nathalie, a high-class call girl. He gets a telephone call from an old friend in the Paris police department, now a businessman whose brother-in-law is missing. The missing man's parents hire Xavier over their daughter's objections, and he quickly finds himself caught up in the underworld of child sex slavery. He guesses that the lost son is dead and shifts his focus to finding and breaking this lucrative business of child trafficking. He gets a reluctant Nathalie to hunt "the Austrian", the shadowy head of the pedophile ring. Violence erupts quickly, and Xavier soon has little more to lose.

Cast
 Daniel Auteuil - Lombard
 Marianne Denicourt - Nathalie 
 Nastassja Kinski - Deborah
 Katrin Cartlidge - Emily 
 Ciarán Hinds - Carlos
 Bruce Greenwood - Alex Friedman 
 Billie Whitelaw - Mrs Spitz
 Cyril Shaps - Mr. Spitz
 Jamie Harris -  Hopper 
 Cal Macaninch - Martin
 Hemal Pandya - Shiva
 Billy Smyth - "Boy No 6"

Reception
DVD Verdict panned the film, writing "The Lost Son has its heart in the right place, but it fumbles the ball by presenting an idea with great potential in a fairly lackluster package. There is not enough substance here to make the film worthy of a purchase." The Herald was mixed in their review, stating that Menges "handles the unpleasant aspects in Eric and Margaret Leclere's script with tact" but that the film had too many unbelievable moments.

References

External links
The Lost Son, by Eric Leclere (pub. Alibi Books 1999, London) - The original novel on which the film was based.

1999 films
1999 crime thriller films
American crime thriller films
American multilingual films
British mystery films
British thriller films
American detective films
Films about child sexual abuse
Films about pedophilia
Films about prostitution in the United Kingdom
Films directed by Chris Menges
Films scored by Goran Bregović
Films set in London
Films set in Mexico
French thriller films
French multilingual films
1990s French-language films
English-language French films
1990s American films
1990s British films
1990s French films